Yəhərçi Qazaxlar (also, Kyrmyzy-Kazakhlar, Yagarchi-Kazakhlar, and Yegarchikazakhlar) is a village and municipality in the Goranboy Rayon of Azerbaijan.  It has a population of 694.

References 

Populated places in Goranboy District